This article presents the discography of the American jazz saxophonist and bandleader John Coltrane (1926–1967).

Introduction 
Coltrane participated in his first recording sessions while enlisted in the Navy from August 6, 1945, to August 11, 1946. He performed eight numbers in a pickup band that included trumpeter Dexter Culbertson. These were private recordings not made for official release. However, one track from the session, "Hot House", eventually appeared on the 1992 compilation The Last Giant: The John Coltrane Anthology.

There are conflicting sources as to whether he made his first professional recording session with Dinah Washington: Jazzdisco.org lists the session as September 27, 1949 in New York City, but Lewis Porter's John Coltrane: His Life and Music states that he was on tour with the Dizzy Gillespie Big Band during that time. Most sources confirm that he recorded with Billy Valentine on November 7 in Los Angeles for Mercury Records. In subsequent years, Coltrane sat in on recording sessions with Gillespie, Johnny Hodges, Earl Bostic, and Gay Crosse.

In September 1955, Coltrane joined the Miles Davis Quintet and appeared on several Miles Davis-led recordings, including 'Round About Midnight and Milestones. He briefly joined Thelonious Monk in May 1957, and their handful of recordings together have been collected on albums such as 1961's Thelonious Monk with John Coltrane. In 1958, he rejoined Davis' band and stayed until April 1960; during that time he participated in the 1959 Kind of Blue sessions.

In April 1957, he signed a contract with Prestige Records; it is unclear if this was a two-year deal or a one-year contract plus a one-year option. Many of Coltrane's recordings for Prestige could be classified as "sideman" recordings and informal jam sessions (or "blowing sessions", in the then-current terminology). He also made his first albums as a group leader, including his 1957 debut, Coltrane. That same year, Prestige allowed him to fulfill a promise that he would make an album for Blue Note, leading to 1957's Blue Train. After Coltrane gained prominence in the early 1960s, Prestige reissued a number of Coltrane's sideman and jam sessions under his name to capitalize on his success. The Prestige Recordings collects all of Coltrane's recordings for Prestige with the exception of his sideman work with Davis.

When his Prestige contract expired, Coltrane signed a two-year contract (one year, plus a one-year option) with Atlantic Records in April 1959. He was the leader of all of these sessions except Bags & Trane and The Avant-Garde, where he was featured with Milt Jackson and Don Cherry respectively. Albums from this period include Giant Steps and My Favorite Things. The Heavyweight Champion box collects his recordings for Atlantic, including all known outtakes.

Coltrane became the first artist to sign with the new Impulse! Records when it bought out his Atlantic contract in April 1961. He would record for the label until the end of his life, and his success earned Impulse! a reputation as "The House That Trane Built". Albums from this final period include the live album Live at Birdland, A Love Supreme, and Ascension.

All of the companies Coltrane worked with during his lifetime have compiled and reissued his material. In addition, Impulse! has issued several previously unreleased live recordings, including Live in Japan and The Olatunji Concert: The Last Live Recording. Coltrane's concert, television and radio performances generated dozens of unauthorized and bootleg recordings. Pablo Records, a label that specializes in live recordings, purchased rights to several tapes of his performances, and is therefore considered a legitimate source despite never signing him to its label.

Studio albums

Prestige Records

Blue Note Records

Savoy Records

Atlantic Records

Impulse! Records

Live albums

Impulse! Records

Pablo Records

Miscellaneous Labels

Appearances

With Miles Davis

With Thelonious Monk

Other appearances

Singles

Compilation albums

Documentaries 

 The World According to John Coltrane (1990)
 The Church of Saint Coltrane (1996)
 Trane Tracks: The Legacy of John Coltrane (2005)
 Chasing Trane: The John Coltrane Documentary (2017)

Video albums 
 John Coltrane: A True Innovator (2004)
 Impressions of Coltrane (2007)
 Chasing Trane- The John Coltrane Documentary (Impulse!, 2017)

Television 
 Jazz Casual: John Coltrane (1963)
 Imagine: Saint John Coltrane (2004)

Notes

External links 
  Jazz Discography Project
 [  Allmusic]
  John Coltrane Discography
 Discogs
 45cat

Sources 

 Chasin' The Trane, J.C. Thomas. (1975, Doubleday)
 John Coltrane: His Life and Music, Lewis Porter. (1998, University of Michigan Press)
 Coltrane: The Story of a Sound, Ben Ratliff. (2007, Farrar, Straus and Giroux)
 The House That Trane Built: The Story of Impulse Records, Ashley Kahn. (2006, W.W. Norton)

Jazz discographies
Discography
 
Discographies of American artists